Nazeh Darwazi (also Romanized  Darwazeh)(ca. 1958-1961 – 19 April 2003), was a Palestinian freelance cameraman for the US news agency Associated Press Television Network (APTN) and Palestinian state television when he was killed in Nablus in the West Bank while reporting, according to eyewitnesses, by a bullet in the head fired by an Israeli soldier from a distance of about 20 yards (6.9 m) after having pointed his weapon at group of journalist.

Darwazi was one of five journalists to die while reporting on the Second Intifada between 2002 and 2003.

Early life
Nazeh Darwazi was born and raised in Nablus. Various accounts of his age were reported. He lived in Nablus with his wife Raeda and their five children. His funeral was reported to have attracted over a thousand people.

Career
Nazeh Darwazi worked for The Associated Press for two years. He was also a journalist for Palestinian television.

Death
Eighteen Palestinians were injured by rubber bullets and live fire, during clashes between Israeli troops and Palestinian's throwing stones. Nazeh Darwazi was filming these fights between Israeli troops and Palestinians in the central Casbah district (Old City), when he was shot through the back of his head by an Israeli soldier positioned behind a tank 6.9m away. Tony Loughran (ZeroRisk International) Independent investigator for APTN has edited previous information on Wikipedia which stated that Nazeh was shot through his right eye from the front, and validated this during the course of his investigation in April 2003.  He was wearing a yellow jacket marked "press" and was with a group of around six journalists covering fights between the group of Palestinians and Israeli soldiers. The journalists said their group shouted in English and Hebrew making clear that they were with the media. Three people filmed the event, including a Reuters cameraman. At first the army claimed they were under attack by armed Palestinians who had been throwing explosives, but witnesses claimed the soldier shot the journalist in cold blood without any exchange of fire.

Investigation
ZeroRisk International (ZRI) commissioned by APTN conducted a thorough investigation into Nazeh's death and produced a report in June 2003. This report not only made it clear how Nazeh was targeted & shot, but provides a number of security & safety recommendations to be implemented on Journalist Hostile Environment Training Courses.
 
Reporters Without Borders also investigated the event and found that the army had not interviewed eyewitnesses. The soldiers had been questioned, but nobody was punished. Palestinian Authority stated that Israel had "committed a war crime" by "opening fire on journalists and other civilians".

ZeroRisk International & The Associated Press said two Palestinian cameramen: Hassan Titi from Reuters and Sami al-Assi from a Palestinian station confirmed that they saw soldier take aim and fire at the journalists. 
Video footage taken by Reuters confirms a soldier kneeling by a tank pointing a rifle down the alley where the journalists were wearing yellow vests stating, Press. Nazeh Darwazeh fell to his death shortly after the soldier fired.

ZeroRisk International (ZRI) used a number of videos provided by all the news networks there that day to piece together the events leading up to and during the shooting. 
All video content was used by ZRI a subsequent re-enactment end forensic investigation with a UK based ballistic & ordnance research centre and provided the basis of ZRI's report published on the 27th June 2003 

The Israeli investigation claimed that Israeli soldiers had been shot at before returning fire when Darwazi was killed. The APTN / ZRI report categorically disputes such a claim and has evidence to prove that the Islraeli soldier shot Nazeh as he turned to his right to film Palestinian children being taken to an ambulance

Context
Some of the journalists who were killed during the Second Intifada include Raffaele Ciriello, Italian; and Imad Abu Zahra and Issam Tillawi, who were both Palestinian. Two weeks after the Darwazi killing, James Miller was also killed on 2 May 2003 by the Israel Defense Forces while making a film about the Second Intifada.

Nazeh Darwazi was covering the Passover clashes in Nablus when he was killed.  Israeli troops arrested several Palestinians in Nablus on suspicion of a planning a potential suicide attack during Passover. Three of the four were arrested around Casbah; the fourth turned himself in at a military checkpoint. In Rafah, five Palestinians were killed by Israeli troops during a raid of a nearby refugee camp in the southern Gaza strip. Twenty-seven people total were wounded in the raid. At the time, Palestinian leader, Yasir Arafat was in a dispute with his handpicked prime minister, Mahmoud Abbas, over the formation of a new government.

Reaction
On Monday April 23, 2003 in front of the international Red Cross headquarters in Al-Khalil district, a group of Palestinian journalists staged a sit-in to publicly declare their disgust with what happened. The Palestinian Authority accused the IDF of war crimes.

Reporters Without Borders, which is based in France, urged President Jacques Chirac to bring the issue of journalist security and safety up when he met with Israeli Moshe Katzav in 2004.

The Committee to Protect Journalists issued statement about Nazeh Darwazi's death. Joel Simon, CPJ, said, "We demand an immediate and thorough inquiry into the shooting death of Nazih Darwazeh and call on you to ensure that those responsible are swiftly brought to justice."

Nazeh Darwazi’s body was wrapped in the Palestinian and carried from the Rafidyeh hospital by representatives of the Palestinian press. Those carrying Darwazi chanted against Israel. They carried his body to the funeral, which over one thousand people attended.

See also
 List of Palestinian civilian casualties in the Second Intifada
 List of journalists killed during the Israeli-Palestinian conflict

References

External links
 Newseum online exhibition for Nazeh Darwazeh
 PBS Frontline Israel/Palestinian Territories, In the Line of Fire, March 2003
 IFJ list IFJ Emergency Appeal to Aid Colleagues Under Fire in Palestine: The Toll of Journalists Hurt and Killed

Year of birth missing
2003 deaths
Deaths by firearm in the West Bank
Journalists killed while covering the Israeli–Palestinian conflict